Slapstick and Old Lace is a British television sketch show which originally aired on ITV in 1971. Starring Charlie Drake, it was his follow-up to his hit television comedy The Worker which had lasted from 1965 to 1970. Also appearing in the show were Anna Dawson and Henry McGee. The title is a reference to the play Arsenic and Old Lace.

In 1976 Drake appeared in a stage show of the same name, which failed due to the extraordinary hot summer during which audience numbers dramatically fell.

References

Bibliography
 Lawrence Goldman. Oxford Dictionary of National Biography 2005–2008. OUP Oxford, 2013.
 Howard Maxford. Hammer Complete: The Films, the Personnel, the Company. McFarland, 2018.

External links
 

1971 British television series debuts
1971 British television series endings
1970s British comedy television series
1970s British television sketch shows
ITV sketch shows
Television series by ITV Studios
Television shows produced by Associated Television (ATV)
English-language television shows